Joseph Whidbey State Park is a  Washington state park in Island County, Washington with  of shoreline on the Strait of Juan de Fuca in north Puget Sound. Park activities include picnicking, ADA-accessible hiking, canoeing, crabbing, beachcombing, and birdwatching. A small section of the Pacific Northwest National Scenic Trail crosses through the park.

References

External links
Joseph Whidbey State Park Washington State Parks and Recreation Commission 
Joseph Whidbey State Park Map Washington State Parks and Recreation Commission

State parks of Washington (state)
Parks in Island County, Washington